During the 1998–99 English football season, Swansea City A.F.C. competed in the Football League Third Division.

Season summary
In the summer of 1998, John Hollins was appointed as Swansea manager and things soon started to improve. In the 1998–99 season, the club reached the Third Division play-offs, only to lose in extra time at Scunthorpe United. The season was also notable for a third round FA Cup victory over Premiership opponents West Ham United, whose team included Frank Lampard, Joe Cole, Rio Ferdinand and John Hartson. Swansea thus became the first bottom division team to defeat a Premiership club in the FA Cup since the re-organisation of the league structure in 1992.

Final league table

Results
Swansea City's score comes first

Legend

Football League Third Division

Third Division play-offs

FA Cup

League Cup

Football League Trophy

Squad

Left club during the season

References

Swansea City A.F.C. seasons
Swansea City
Swan